The Minister of Foreign Affairs is a cabinet minister of Liberia in charge of the Ministry of Foreign Affairs, a government ministry responsible for conducting foreign relations of the country.

Originally called the "Secretary of State", the position assumed its current name in 1972. 

Between 1848 and 1981, every officeholder came from Montserrado County, Liberia's most populous county. The first individual to fill the post from outside of Montserrado was H. Boimah Fahnbulleh, Jr., who was originally from Grand Cape Mount County.

List of officeholders

Source: 

 Status

Notes

See also
 Foreign relations of Liberia
 Ministry of Foreign Affairs (Liberia)
 List of diplomatic missions of Liberia

References

Government of Liberia
Foreign ministers
Foreign ministers
Liberia
Foreign Ministers of Liberia